Thirumansolai is a small village located on Sivagangai to Madurai National Highways in Sivagangai District, Tamil Nadu state, India.

Villages in Sivaganga district